Éclimeux is a commune in the Pas-de-Calais department in the Hauts-de-France region of France.

Geography
A rural village situated some 5 miles (8 km) east of Hesdin on the D105 junction with the D106 road.

Places of interest
 The eighteenth-century church of Notre-Dame
 Remains of a 17th-century château

Population

See also
Communes of the Pas-de-Calais department

References

Communes of Pas-de-Calais
Artois